Secret Heart Beat is a 2002 Burmese film, directed by Ma Li Kha Soe Htike Aung starring Dwe, Htet Htet Moe Oo and Yaza Ne Win. The film, produced by Ma Li Kha Film Production, premiered in Myanmar on 6 December 2002.

Synopsis
This film showed love between three person, Thway Thit, a person who is light-hearted and careless, Nyi Khit, a person who is calm and honest and Lone May Khin, a young girl who is honest and confident.

Cast
Aung Lwin as U Khant Aung
Dwe as Nyi Khit (son)
Yaza Ne Win as Thway Thit (son)
Htet Htet Moe Oo as Lone May Khin

References

2002 films
2000s Burmese-language films
Burmese romantic drama films
Films shot in Myanmar